Mohi-ud-Din Islamic University (MIU) is a private university in Nerian Sharif, Azad Kashmir, Pakistan, that offers undergraduate and post-graduate education. It was established under Act 1 of Azad Jammu and Kashmir Legislative Assembly.

History 

Mohi-ud-Din Islamic University, Nerian Sharif, Azad Kashmir. It is a chartered university and is recognized by the Higher Education Commission of Pakistan (HEC). On the basis of academic excellence achieved by the university, it has been placed in the highest category - 'W' (A).

Degree programs
Bachelor of Business Administration 
Bachelor of Commerce
BS Biotechnology
BS Chemistry
BS Computer Science
BS English
BS Islamic Studies
BS Mathematics
BS Sports Sciences & Physical Education
LLB (5 Years)
M.A English
M.Phil. Biotechnology
M.Phil. Botany
M.Phil. Chemistry
M.Phil. Education
M.Sc. Botany
M.Sc. Chemistry
M.Sc. Economics
M.Sc. Mathematics
MS Computer Science
MS Management Science
Ph.D. Mathematics
MBBS
Doctor of Pharmacy (PharmD)

References

External links
 

Universities and colleges in Azad Kashmir
Private universities and colleges in Pakistan
Islamic universities and colleges in Pakistan
Mohi-ud-Din Educational Institutes